Prince Efe Ehiorobo (born 12 April 1983 in Benin City) is a Nigerian football player who is currently playing for Lärje-Angereds IF.

Career
Ehiorobo started his career in Invisible-Leopards FC Warri before joining DSC Aladja. He then joined NPA of Warri where he had much success and was selected Pepsi Player of the Month. He finished second in the Nigerian Premiership top scorer table. He then came to Sweden in 2001 and signed for GAIS 2002. In GAIS he was selected best player of the season 2004. In 2007, he played a few matches with Swedish lower league team Torslanda IK, he then signed for Norwegian team Drøbak/Frogn IL.

Later he signed for Løv-Ham Fotball in Adeccoligaen. He played for the team in 3 season and later signed for Swedish team Åtvidabergs FF in November 2009 and turned on 12 March 2010 back to his club Løv-Ham Fotball. In 2011, he played for Bryne FK, but moved to Lärje-Angereds IF ahead of the 2012 season. He went ahead and won the league with Lärje-Angered. In August 2012 he participated in Futsal Champions League with FC Ibra.

International career
Ehiorobo was in 2001 invited to the Nigeria national football team and earned his only call up for the Africa Cup of Nations qualification games against Madagascar national football team.

References

1983 births
Living people
Nigerian footballers
Nigeria international footballers
Warri Wolves F.C. players
GAIS players
Torslanda IK players
Drøbak-Frogn IL players
Løv-Ham Fotball players
Åtvidabergs FF players
Bryne FK players
Norwegian First Division players
Nigerian expatriate footballers
Nigerian expatriate sportspeople in Norway
Nigerian expatriate sportspeople in Sweden
Expatriate footballers in Norway
Expatriate footballers in Sweden
Association football midfielders
Sportspeople from Benin City